This is the Cabinet of Uttarakhand headed by the Chief Minister of Uttarakhand, Ramesh Pokhriyal from 2009–2011.

Council of Ministers

Here is the list of ministers.

 Cabinet Ministers:
 Matbar Singh Kandari - Irrigation, Minor Irrigation, Flood Control, Food & Civil Supplies, Social Welfare & Handicapped Welfare
 Prakash Pant - Parliamentary Affairs, Legislatures, Drinking Water, Labour, Re-organisation, Externally aided project, Election, Uttarakhand river projects related to India Nepal Border
 Diwakar Bhatt - Revenue, Land management, Disaster management, Food & Civil Supplies, Soldier Welfare
 Madan Kaushik - Excise, Sugarcane Development and Sugar Industry, Urban Development, Tourism 
 Trivendra Singh Rawat - Agriculture, Agricultural Education, Agricultural Marketing, Fruit industry, Animal Husbandry, Milk Development, Fisheries 
 Rajendra Singh Bhandari - Panchayati Raj, Alternative Energy, Census, Civil Defense and Home Guard, Jail

 Ministers of State (Independent Charge):
 Vijaya Barthwal - Rural Development, Women Welfare & Child Development
 Govind Singh Bisht - Education (Primary, Secondary & Higher)

 Ministers of State:
 Khajan Das - Disaster Management, Social Welfare
 Balwant Singh Bhauryal - Health & Family Welfare, Information Technology

Former Ministers
 Cabinet Minister:
 Bishan Singh Chuphal - Forests and wild animals, Environment, Watershed management, Transport, Cooperatives, Protocol, Rural Engineering (5 July 2009 - 24 December 2009)

References

Uttarakhand ministries
2009 establishments in Uttarakhand
Cabinets established in 2009
Cabinets disestablished in 2011
2011 disestablishments in India
Bharatiya Janata Party state ministries